The Kamienica is a river in Lesser Poland Voivodeship in south-west Poland. The river is a tributary of the Dunajec in the Poprad valley basin. It meets the Dunajec at Nowy Sącz.

Rivers of Poland
Rivers of Lesser Poland Voivodeship